The following is a list of neighborhoods and communities located in the city of San Diego. The City of San Diego Planning Department officially lists 52 Community Planning Areas within the city, many of which consist of multiple different neighborhoods.

Alphabetical 

 
 Allied Gardens
 Alta Vista
 Balboa Park
 Bankers Hill
 Barrio Logan
 Bay Ho
 Bay Park
 Bay Terraces
 
 
 Birdland
 Black Mountain Ranch
 Broadway Heights
 Carmel Mountain Ranch
 Carmel Valley
 Chollas View
 City Heights

 Clairemont (Clairemont Mesa)
 
 
 
 College Area
 
 
 

 Del Cerro
 Del Mar Heights
 Del Mar Mesa
 Downtown

 Egger Highlands
 El Cerrito
 Emerald Hills
 Encanto
 Fairbanks Ranch Country Club
 Golden Hill
 Grant Hill
 Grantville
 Harbor Island
 Hillcrest
 
 Jamacha
 Kearny Mesa
 Kensington
 La Jolla
 
 
 
 
 
 
 
 
 
 
 
 
 
 
 
 

 Lake Murray
 Liberty Station
 Lincoln Park
 Linda Vista
 Logan Heights
 
 Lomita Village
 Middletown
 Midway
 Mira Mesa
 Miramar
 Miramar Ranch North
 Mission Bay Park
 Mission Beach
 Mission Hills
 Mission Valley
 
 
 
 
 Morena
 Mount Hope
 Mountain View
 Navajo
 Nestor
 Normal Heights
 
 
 
 North Park
 
 
 
 O'Farrell (South Encanto)
 Oak Park
 Ocean Beach
 Ocean View Hills
 Old Town
 Otay Mesa
 Otay Mesa West
 Pacific Beach
 Pacific Highlands Ranch
 Palm City
 Paradise Hills

 Point Loma

 
 
 
 

 Rancho Bernardo
 Rancho Encantada (Stonebridge)
 Rancho Peñasquitos
 Redwood Village
 Rolando
 Rolando Park
 Rolando Village
 Sabre Springs
 San Carlos
 San Pasqual Valley
 San Ysidro
 Scripps Ranch
 Serra Mesa
 Shelltown
 Shelter Island
 Sherman Heights
 Skyline
 Sorrento Valley
 
 South Park
 Southcrest
 Stockton
 Sunset Cliffs
 Talmadge
 Tierrasanta
 Tijuana River Valley
 Torrey Highlands
 Torrey Hills
 Torrey Pines
 University City
 University Heights
 Valencia Park
 Via de la Valle
 Webster

By city council district

Northwestern (District 1) 
 Carmel Valley
 Del Mar Heights
 Del Mar Mesa
 Fairbanks Ranch Country Club
 La Jolla
 
 
 
 
 
 
 
 
 
 
 
 
 
 
 
 
 Pacific Beach
 Pacific Highlands Ranch
 Torrey Hills
 Torrey Pines
 Via de la Valle

Western (District 2) 
Bay Ho
Bay Park
Harbor Island
Liberty Station
Midway
Mission Bay Park
Mission Beach
Morena
Ocean Beach
Point Loma 

 
 
 
 

Shelter Island
Sunset Cliffs

Central (District 3) 
Balboa Park
Bankers Hill
Downtown 

Golden Hill
Hillcrest
 
Middletown
Mission Hills
Mission Valley West
 
 
Normal Heights
 
 
 
 North Park
 
 
 
Old Town
South Park
University Heights

Southeastern (District 4) 
Alta Vista
Bay Terraces
 
 
Broadway Heights
Chollas View
Emerald Hills
Encanto
Jamacha
Lincoln Park
Lomita Village
Mountain View
O'Farrell (South Encanto)
Oak Park
Paradise Hills
Redwood Village
Ridgeview
Rolando Park
Valencia Park
Webster

Northeastern (District 5) 
Black Mountain Ranch
Carmel Mountain
Miramar Ranch North
Rancho Bernardo
Rancho Encantada (Stonebridge)
Rancho Peñasquitos
Sabre Springs
San Pasqual Valley
Scripps Ranch
Torrey Highlands

Northern (District 6) 
Clairemont
 
 
 
Kearny Mesa
Mira Mesa
Miramar
Sorrento Valley

University City

Eastern (District 7) 
Allied Gardens
Birdland
Del Cerro
Grantville
Lake Murray
Linda Vista
Mission Valley East
San Carlos
Serra Mesa
Tierrasanta

Southern & South (District 8) 
Southern:
Barrio Logan
Grant Hill
Logan Heights
 
Shelltown
Sherman Heights
Southcrest

South:
Egger Highlands
Nestor
Ocean View Hills
Otay Mesa
Otay Mesa West
Palm City
San Ysidro
Tijuana River Valley

Mid-City (District 9) 
City Heights 

College Area
 
 
 
El Cerrito
Kensington
Mount Hope
Rolando Village
Stockton
Talmadge

See also

References

External links

 SanDiego.org: San Diego Neighborhood Guide

 01
 01
San Diego
communities
Geography of San Diego